The 1993 South Carolina Gamecocks football team represented the University of South Carolina in the Southeastern Conference (SEC) during the 1993 NCAA Division I-A football season.  The Gamecocks were led by head coach Sparky Woods and played their home games in Williams-Brice Stadium in Columbia, South Carolina.

Schedule

Roster
QB Steve Taneyhill, Soph
QB Desi Sargent, Junior

References

South Carolina
South Carolina Gamecocks football seasons
South Carolina Gamecocks football